Brandon Hurst (30 November 1866 – 15 July 1947) was an English stage and film actor.

Early life
Born in London, England, Hurst studied philology in his youth and began performing in theater in the 1880s.

Before he began acting professionally, Hurst served seven years in the English army, including five years with the King's Dragoon Guards in India.

Career 
He worked in Broadway shows from 1900 until his entry into motion pictures. His most notable stage appearance was Two Women in 1910, costarring Mrs. Leslie Carter and Robert Warwick.

He was nearly fifty before his film debut in Via Wireless (1915) as Edward Pinckney. He appeared in 129 other films. He became well known in the 1920s for portraying the antagonist and anti-heroes. Those roles include Sir George Carewe in Dr. Jekyll and Mr. Hyde (1920), Jehan Frollo in The Hunchback of Notre Dame (1923), Alexei Karenin opposite Greta Garbo in Love (1927), and Barkilphedro in The Man Who Laughs (1928).

His roles in sound films during the 1920s and 1930s were often small. One of his more important roles was the sinister Merlin the Magician in Fox's A Connecticut Yankee (1931). Hurst worked as an actor until his death, his last film was Two Guys from Texas (1948).

Filmography

 Via Wireless (1915) - Edward Pinckney (film debut)
 Dr. Jekyll and Mr. Hyde (1920) - Sir George Carewe
 A Dark Lantern (1920) - Colonel Dereham
 The World's Applause (1923) - James Crane
 Legally Dead (1923) - Dr. Gelzer
 The Hunchback of Notre Dame (1923) - Jehan Frollo
 The Thief of Bagdad (1924) - The Caliph
 Cytherea (1924) - Daniel Randon
 One Night in Rome (1924) - Count Beetholde
 The Silent Watcher (1924) - Herrold, the reporter
 He Who Gets Slapped (1924) - Clown (uncredited)
 The Lover of Camille (1924) - Bertrand
 The Lady (1925) - St. Aubyns Sr
 Lightnin' (1925) - Everett Hammond
 The Enchanted Hill (1926) - Jasper Doak
 Made for Love (1926) - Pharaoh
 The Grand Duchess and the Waiter (1926) - Matard - Hotel Manager
 Secret Orders (1926) - Butler
 Paris at Midnight (1926) - Count Tarrefer
 The Shamrock Handicap (1926) - The Procurer of Taxes (uncredited)
 The Rainmaker (1926) - Doyle
 Volcano! (1926) - André de Chauvalons
 The Amateur Gentleman (1926) - Peterby
 The Lady of the Harem (1926) - Beggar
 The King of Kings (1927) (uncredited)
 7th Heaven (1927) - Uncle George (uncredited)
 Annie Laurie (1927) - The Campbell Chieftain
 The High School Hero (1927) - Mr. Golden
 Love (1927) - Karenin
 The Man Who Laughs (1928) - Barkilphedro
 News Parade (1928) - A.K. Wellington
 Interference (1928) - Inspector Haynes
 The Voice of the Storm (1929) - Dr. Isaacs
 The Wolf of Wall Street (1929) - Sturgess
 The Greene Murder Case (1929) - Sproot
 Her Private Life (1929) - Sir Emmett Wildering
 High Society Blues (1930) - Jowles
 The Eyes of the World (1930) - Mr. Taine
 The Right of Way (1931) - Crown Attorney
 A Connecticut Yankee (1931) - Merlin/Doctor in Mansion
 Young as You Feel (1931) - Robbins
 Murder at Midnight (1931) - Lawrence
 Murders in the Rue Morgue (1932) - Prefect of Police
 Scarface (1932) - Citizens Committee Member (uncredited)
 The Midnight Lady (1932) - District Attorney
 White Zombie (1932) - Silver
 Down to Earth (1932) - Jeffrey, the Butler
 Sherlock Holmes (1932) - Secretary to Erskine (uncredited)
 Rasputin and the Empress (1932) - Staff General (uncredited)
 Cavalcade (1933) - Gilbert & Sullivan Actor (uncredited)
 I Love That Man (1933) - Banker Burkhart (uncredited)
 Bombay Mail (1934) - Pundit Garnath Chundra
 The Lost Patrol (1934) - Bell
 The House of Rothschild (1934) - Stock Trader
 House of Mystery (1934) - Hindu Priest
 Viva Villa! (1934) - Statesman (uncredited)
 Have a Heart (1934) - Bramley, Consulting Doctor (uncredited)
 Crimson Romance (1934) - English Officer
 Red Morning (1934) - Island Magistrate
 Bright Eyes (1934) - Higgins
 The Little Minister (1934) - Anders Strothers (uncredited)
 The Woman in Red (1935) - Uncle Emlen Wyatt
 While the Patient Slept (1935) - Grondal
 Bonnie Scotland (1935) - Military Policeman (uncredited)
 Annie Oakley (1935) - Doctor Treating Toby (uncredited)
 The Great Impersonation (1935) - Middleton
 A Tale of Two Cities (1935) - Minor Role (uncredited)
 The Moon's Our Home (1936) - Babson
 Mary of Scotland (1936) - Airan
 The Charge of the Light Brigade (1936) - Lord Raglan (uncredited)
 The Plough and the Stars (1936) - Sergeant Tinley
 Stolen Holiday (1937) - Police Detective (uncredited)
 Maid of Salem (1937) - Tithing Man
 Maytime (1937) - Master of Ceremonies (uncredited)
 Wee Willie Winkie (1937) - Bagby
 The Firefly (1937) - English General (uncredited)
 Four Men and a Prayer (1938) - Jury Foreman (uncredited)
 Kidnapped (1938) - Doomster
 Professor Beware (1938) - Charlile - Butler (uncredited)
 If I Were King (1938) - Beggar (uncredited)
 Suez (1938) - Franz Liszt
 East Side of Heaven (1939) - Butler (uncredited)
 Tell No Tales (1939) - Lovelake's Butler (uncredited)
 The Sun Never Sets (1939) - Doctor (uncredited)
 Stanley and Livingstone (1939) - Sir Henry Forrester
 It's a Wonderful World (1939) - Paul Henry
 The Blue Bird (1940) - Footman
 If I Had My Way (1940) - Hedges (uncredited)
 Rhythm on the River (1940) - Bates (uncredited)
 The Howards of Virginia (1940) - Wilton (uncredited)
 Sign of the Wolf (1941) - Dr. Morton
 Charley's Aunt (1941) - Coach (uncredited)
 Dr. Jekyll and Mr. Hyde (1941) - Briggs, Lanyon's Butler (uncredited)
 Birth of the Blues (1941) - Headwaiter in Cafe (uncredited)
 Road to Happiness (1941) - Swayne
 The Remarkable Andrew (1942) - Mr. Chief Justice John Marshall
 The Ghost of Frankenstein (1942) - Hans (uncredited)
 The Mad Martindales (1942) - Smythe Butler
 The Pied Piper (1942) - Major Domo (uncredited)
 Road to Morocco (1942) - English Announcer (uncredited)
 Tennessee Johnson (1942) - Senator (uncredited)
 The Leopard Man (1943) - Cemetery Gatekeeper (uncredited)
 The Constant Nymph (1943) - Minor Role (uncredited)
 Dixie (1943) - Dignified Man in Audience
 The Man from Down Under (1943) - Government Official at Train Station (uncredited)
 Thank Your Lucky Stars (1943) - Cab Driver in 'Good Night, Good Neighbor' Number (uncredited)
 Jane Eyre (1943) - Lowood School Trustee (uncredited)
 Shine On, Harvest Moon (1944) - Watchman (uncredited)
 Radio Bugs (1944, Short) - Shakespearean Actor (uncredited) 
 The Adventures of Mark Twain (1944) - Ralph Waldo Emerson (uncredited)
 The Canterville Ghost (1944) - Mr. Peabody (uncredited)
 Mrs. Parkington (1944) - Footman (uncredited)
 The Princess and the Pirate (1944) - Mr. Pelly
 House of Frankenstein (1944) - Dr. Geissler
 The Man in Half Moon Street (1945) - Simpson—Butler
 The Corn Is Green (1945) - Lewellyn Powell (uncredited)
 The Great John L. (1945) - Prince of Wales' Valet (uncredited)
 The Spanish Main (1945) - The Sea Lawyer (uncredited)
 Confidential Agent (1945) - Man on Train (uncredited)
 Road to Utopia (1945) - Man at Zambini's (uncredited)
 San Antonio (1945) - Gambler (uncredited)
 The Green Years (1946) - Bookseller (uncredited)
 Monsieur Beaucaire (1946) - Marquis (uncredited)
 Sister Kenny (1946) - Mr. Todd - Landlord (uncredited)
 Magnificent Doll (1946) - Brown (uncredited)
 The Time, the Place and the Girl (1946) - Simpkins - the Cassel's Butler (uncredited)
 My Favorite Brunette (1947) - Butler (uncredited)
 Welcome Stranger (1947) - Townsman (uncredited)
 Where There's Life (1947) - Floor Walker (uncredited)
 My Wild Irish Rose (1947) - Michael the Gardener (uncredited)
 Road to Rio (1947) - Barker (uncredited)
 Two Guys from Texas (1948) - Judge (final film) (uncredited)

References

External links

 
 
 Still from The Stronger Sex (1907) with Maude Fealy

English male film actors
English male silent film actors
English male stage actors
Male actors from London
19th-century English male actors
20th-century English male actors
1866 births
1947 deaths